The 2012 Aegon Classic was a women's tennis tournament played on outdoor grass courts. It was the 31st edition of the event. It took place at the Edgbaston Priory Club in Birmingham, United Kingdom, scheduled between 11 and 17 June 2012. Qualifier Melanie Oudin won the singles title.

Singles main draw entrants

Seeds

 1 Rankings are as of May 28, 2012

Other entrants
The following players received wildcards into the main draw:
  Jelena Janković
  Tara Moore
  Samantha Murray
  Francesca Schiavone
  Melanie South

The following players received entry from the qualifying draw:
  Vera Dushevina
  Michelle Larcher de Brito
  Noppawan Lertcheewakarn
  Grace Min
  Melanie Oudin
  Alison Riske
  Abigail Spears
  Zheng Jie

The following players received entry via the Lucky loser spot:
  Sesil Karatantcheva
  Alla Kudryavtseva

Withdrawals
  Sofia Arvidsson
  Petra Cetkovská
  Simona Halep
  Jarmila Gajdošová (left wrist injury)
  Kaia Kanepi
  Peng Shuai
  Lesia Tsurenko

Retirements
The following players retired from the singles main draw:
  Casey Dellacqua
  Michaëlla Krajicek (viral illness)
  Ayumi Morita
  Virginie Razzano

Doubles main draw entrants

Seeds

1 Rankings are as of May 28, 2012

Other entrants
The following pair received wildcard into the doubles main draw:
  Laura Robson /  Heather Watson
The following pair received entry as alternates:
  Tara Moore /  Melanie South

Withdrawals
  Michaëlla Krajicek (viral illness)

Retirements
  Laura Robson (viral illness)
  Zheng Jie (gastrointestinal illness)

Finals

Singles

 Melanie Oudin defeated  Jelena Janković, 6–4, 6–2
It is the first career title for Oudin

Doubles

  Tímea Babos /  Hsieh Su-wei defeated  Liezel Huber /  Lisa Raymond, 7–5, 6–7(2–7), [10–8]

References

 Entry list

External links
Official website

Aegon Classic
Aegon Classic
Birmingham Classic (tennis)
Aegon Classic
2012 in English tennis